Irina Guliaeva (born 17 May 1984) is a Russian biathlete. She represented the Neutral Paralympic Athletes at the 2018 Winter Paralympics.

Ekaterina won a bronze medal in the women's 10km sitting event at the 2018 Winter Paralympics.

References

External links 
 
 
 
 Getty images
 

1984 births
Living people
Russian female biathletes
Biathletes at the 2018 Winter Paralympics
Paralympic biathletes of Russia
Medalists at the 2018 Winter Paralympics
Paralympic medalists in biathlon
Paralympic bronze medalists for Russia